Vol. 9 or Volume Nine, or Volume IX, or Volume 9 may refer to:

Video games
 Vol. 9: The Renai Adventure ~Bittersweet Fools~, a videogame

Music
Volume 9 (Shinhwa album), album of South Korean boy band Shinhwa
Volume 9, (1940-1941) by Sidney Bechet   2002 
Volume 9, by Point Blank 2014 
 Volume 9: I See You Hearin' Me, an album by the Desert Sessions
Pebbles, Volume 9 (CD)
Pebbles, Volume 9 (LP)
Anjunabeats Volume 9
Dick's Picks Volume 9

See also